The 2019 Georgian Cup was a single elimination association football tournament which began in early 2019 and ended on 8 December 2019. The winner of the cup earned a place in the 2020–21 UEFA Europa League.

Torpedo Kutaisi were the defending champions of the Cup after winning the final in the previous season in a penalty shoot-out over Gagra.

Format
In 2019, the Georgian Cup was contested between 58 clubs. All rounds of the competition were decided over one leg. Any match which was level after regulation proceeded to extra time and then to penalties, when needed, to determine the winning club.

First round 
Fourteen second round matches were played on 24 March 2019.

|}

Second round
Twelve second round matches were played on 27–29 March 2019.

|}

Third round
Sixteen third round matches were played on 16–17 April 2019.

|}

Fourth round
Eight fourth round matches were played on 18–19 June 2019.

|}

Quarter finals
Four quarter final matches were played on 24 & 25 September 2019.

|}

Semi finals
Two semi final matches were played on the 23 October 2019.

|}

Final
The final was played on 8 December 2019.

See also 
 2019 Erovnuli Liga

References

External links
 Official site  

Georgian Cup seasons
Georgian Cup
Cup